On November 8, 2016, Illinois voters approved the Illinois Transportation Taxes and Fees Lockbox Amendment, a legislatively referred constitutional amendment that prohibits lawmakers from using transportation funds for anything other than their stated purpose.

Amendment text
The amendment added the following a Section 11 to Article IX of the Illinois Constitution:

Passage in the legislature
The amendment had been sponsored in the legislature by Democrat Brandon Phelps.

Only four members of the Illinois House of Representatives voted against placing the amendment on the ballot (Democrats Barbara Flynn Currie, Laura Fine,  Elaine Nekritz, and Pamela Reaves-Harris). The four published an op-ed in which they argued, "Experience has demonstrated that unexpected events can have drastic impacts on our state budget. A major natural disaster or economic turmoil can blow huge holes in a budget, even in states in healthy financial condition - which Illinois is decidedly not. This amendment would severely curtail the ability of the state to react to these types of events."

Election
In order to be approved, the measure required either 60% support among those specifically voting on the amendment or 50% support among all ballots cast in the elections.

The ballot title was,

The ballot summary read,

Endorsements

Results

References

Transportation Taxes and Fees Lockbox Amendment
2016 Illinois elections
Transportation Taxes and Fees Lockbox Amendment
2014 ballot measures
 Transportation Taxes and Fees Lockbox Amendment